Edward Powell (c.1478–1540) was a Welsh Roman Catholic priest and theologian.

Edward or Eddie Powell may also refer to:
Edward B. Powell (1909–1984), American arranger, orchestrator and composer
Edward Angus Powell Jr. (born 1948), former president of the United Service Organizations
Eddie Powell (1927–2000), British stuntman and actor. 
Eddie Powell (baseball) (1910–1986), American baseball player

See also